Living Vehicle produce self-sustainable trailers designed to support human habitation with very little to no resource needs from external sources.

Living Vehicle trailers are purpose-built to live in year-round, thus they are capable of supporting human habitation in all seasons, including sub-freezing temperatures. They are also able to create and manage resources for continued  and indefinite off-grid use.

History 
Living Vehicle was founded in  2017  by a couple; Matthew and Joanna Hofmann. Inspired by years of traveling full-time in mobile spaces while running a custom mobile design firm in Santa Barbara, CA, Matthew and Joanna Hofmann felt the need to create a new mobile space designed for a modern mobile lifestyle. LV is offered with very limited production per year.

In 2022, Living Vehicle was the first to release Atmospheric Water Generation in a production vehicle. Since its foundation in 2017, LV comes in different generations and models with diverse specifications.

See also  
 Electric vehicle
 Recreational vehicle
 Vehicular automation
 Self-driving car
 Automotive navigation system

References

External links
 

Land vehicles with sleeping facilities
Electric vehicles